Ugar Island is an island locality in the Torres Strait Island Region, Queensland, Australia. It consists of a single island, Stephens Island in the Torres Strait.

Education 
Stephen Island Campus is a primary (Early Childhood-6) campus of Tagai State College.

References 

Torres Strait Island Region
Localities in Queensland